The 1990 Soviet Chess Championship was the 57th edition of USSR Chess Championship. Held from 18 October to 5 November 1990 in Leningrad. The title was won by Alexander Beliavsky. Semifinals took place at Gorky, Daugavpils and Kherson.

Semifinals 
The semifinals were played late in 1989. At Gorky, Vyzhmanavin (10/13), Dvoiris 9 and Dreev 8½ classified. At the Latvian venue of Daugavpils, Smirin, Rozentalis and Aseev made 10/14; while Alexey Shirov finished with only 8. Kherson in the Ukraine, Novikov and G.Kuzmin had 10½/15.

Final

References 

USSR Chess Championships
1990 in chess
1990 in Soviet sport